Bushkovo is a rural locality (a village) in Krasavinskoye Rural Settlement, Velikoustyugsky District, Vologda Oblast, Russia. The population was 17 as of 2002.

Geography 
Bushkovo is located 17 km northeast of Veliky Ustyug (the district's administrative centre) by road. Polutovo is the nearest rural locality.

References 

Rural localities in Velikoustyugsky District